Edward W. Atwood was an American lawyer and politician from Maine. Atwood, a Republican, represented Portland in the Maine House of Representatives for two terms from 19231926. Prior to serving in the Legislature, Atwood had served as a Flying Ace during World War I.

Atwood was a longtime lobbyist and partner in the law firm Pierce Atwood. As a lobbyist, he worked on behalf of the state's leading paper companies, which owned much of the land and controlled a significant amount of Maine's economy. Vincent L. McKusick, who was a partner in the firm, described him as "a very effective lawyer."

References

Year of birth missing
Year of death missing
Maine lawyers
Politicians from Portland, Maine
Republican Party members of the Maine House of Representatives
Lawyers from Portland, Maine